Froma Harrop (born March 18, 1950 in New York City) is an American writer and author. 

She is best known for her bi-weekly syndicated column.

Early life
Born in New York City, Harrop was raised in suburban Long Island and attended New York University. She graduated in 1972.

Career
Harrop worked at the financial desk at Reuters, covering business and the Federal Reserve, and later became a business editor for The New York Times News Service. She returned to her reporting roots as a business writer for the Providence Journal in Rhode Island and subsequently joined the Journal’s editorial board, where she was a member until 2013.  Harrop currently resides in Providence and New York City.

References

Living people
1950 births
Journalists from New York City
Jewish American journalists
American women journalists
American columnists
American women columnists
New York University alumni
20th-century American women writers
20th-century American non-fiction writers
21st-century American Jews
21st-century American women